The chart is compiled and published by RPM every Monday.These are the Canadian number-one albums of 1994. The chart was compiled and published by RPM every Monday.

See also
1994 in music
RPM number-one hits of 1994

References

1994
1994 record charts
1994 in Canadian music